Rawle,  Rawles, or Rawls is a surname, and may refer to:

Cecil Rawle (27 March 1891 – 9 June 1938) a politician from Dominica
Francis Rawle (1660–1727), colonist in Philadelphia
George Rawle (2 December 1889 – 12 June 1978) an Australian rules footballer
Graham Rawle UK writer
James Wesley Rawles (born 1960) US novelist
Jeff Rawle (born 20 July 1951) a British actor
John Rawls (21 February 1921 – 24 November 2002) an American philosopher
Keith Rawle (29 October 1924 – 6 March 2005) an Australian rules footballer 
Mark Rawle (born 27 April 1979) a professional footballer
Nancy Rawles US novelist
Richard Rawle (1812–1889) bishop
Samuel Rawle (1771–1860) an English topographical engraver
Sid Rawle  (1 October 1945 – 31 August 2010) English political activist
Tim Rawle English architectural photographer
William Rawle  (April 28, 1759 – April 12, 1836) US lawyer